Michael Powolny (18 September 1871 – 4 January 1954) was an Austrian sculptor, medallist, ceramist, designer, and teacher.

Powolny was born in Judenburg. He was trained at Tonindustrie in Znaim, and from 1894 to 1901 in the Wiener Kunstgewerbeschule. In 1906 along with Bertold Löffler he founded the Wiener Keramik workshop, that became part of the Wiener Werkstätte a year later.

Powolny died in Vienna. He is known for various individual sculptures and municipal monuments such as fountains and war memorials, but also for designs for household objects, and Austrian coins.

External links 
 Michael Powolny in the RKD

1871 births
1954 deaths
People from Judenburg
Austrian male sculptors
20th-century Austrian sculptors
Wiener Werkstätte
20th-century Austrian male artists